Sankhol is a village located in Bahadurgarh, just 30 km from Jhajjar city in Jhajjar district, Haryana, India and along NH 9 (formerly NH 10). Sankhol comes in Assembly constituency 64-Bahadurgarh. The village has four polling stations (polling station no. 56, 57, 58, 59). Today the village is 403 years old (as in 2018) with 25–30 generation of people born.

Demographics
 India census, Sankhol had a population of 5178. Males constitute 54% of the population and females 46%. Sankhol has an average literacy rate of 70%, higher than the national average of 59.5%: male literacy is 78%, and female literacy is 60%. In Sankhol, 13% of the population is under 6 years of age.

History 
In Samwat 1672 (i.e. On 5TH NOVEMBER 1615 ; on Guru Nanak Jayanti ) Kartika month on Thursday Purnima  Ch. SUKHLA RATHI RATHI established the village SANKHOL along with people from 7 different cast. Ch. Sukhla Rathi was a Kshatriya originally from Tungdesh (now Prabhas Patan, Somnath, Gujrat) and moved to Sankhol in search for a better place for prosperity while halting at Hastinapur, Tamargarh, Delhi (Mehrauli), Gopalgarh, Hariyapur, Kasar, Parnala, Sarfabad (now Bahadurgarh) and finally at Sankhol.

The village was internally divided into three Pannas by the three brothers of 6–7 generation becoming the head of each Panna i.e. Bhortha, Gullar and Baggri.

Notable Persons

Brigadier Hoshier Singh Rathee 
Brigadier Hoshiar Singh IOM, IDSM, Croix De Guerre was the commander of the Indian 62 Brigade stationed at Sela Pass. Brigadier Singh was killed in action, along with a few Indian troops during the 1962 Sino-Indian War. Brigadier Hoshiar Singh was commended for his bravery in the war. Prime Minister Jawaharlal Nehru, along with Pratap Singh Kairon, the then Chief Minister of Punjab, had visited this village personally to pay homage to the late Brigadier.

Pandit Ram Kishan Sharma
Pandit Ram Kishan Sharma was a very noble person who lived in Bagra Paana in White House.
He was close friend of the Brigadier.

References

Cities and towns in Jhajjar district